Stephanie Joline, sometimes credited as Stephanie Clattenburg, is a Canadian film and television director. She is most noted for her work on the television documentary series Spirit Talker, for which she won the Canadian Screen Award for Best Direction in a Factual Program or Series at the 10th Canadian Screen Awards in 2022.

Her full length feature film debut, Night Blooms, premiered in 2021 and was a nominee for the DGC Discovery Award.

Based in Halifax, Nova Scotia, she is of Acadian and Inuit descent. She was formerly married to filmmaker Mike Clattenburg from 2009 to 2015.

References

External links

21st-century Canadian screenwriters
21st-century Canadian women writers
Canadian women screenwriters
Canadian women film directors
Canadian television directors
Canadian women television directors
Film directors from Nova Scotia
Canadian people of Inuit descent
Acadian people
Living people
Canadian Screen Award winners
Year of birth missing (living people)